Libuše Patočková (17 March 1933 – 1 January 2010) was a Czech cross-country skier. She competed in the women's 10 km and the women's 3 × 5 km relay events at the 1956 Winter Olympics.

Cross-country skiing results

Olympic Games

World Championships

References

External links
 

1933 births
2010 deaths
Czech female cross-country skiers
Olympic cross-country skiers of Czechoslovakia
Cross-country skiers at the 1956 Winter Olympics
Place of birth missing